The following is an alphabetical list of topics related to Canada.

0–9

 .ca – Internet country code top-level domain for Canada
 49th parallel north
 60th parallel north
 100 km isolated peaks of Canada
 102nd meridian west
 110th meridian west
 120th meridian west
 141st meridian west
 150th anniversary of Canada
 1500 metre prominent peaks of Canada
 1958 Jim Mideon 500 - a NASCAR Sprint Cup Series racing event that took place in Toronto
 4000 metre peaks of Canada

A

 A few acres of snow
 Aboriginal peoples in Canada
 Abortion in Canada
 Acadia
 Access copyright
 Addition Elle
 Adjacent and neighbouring countries:
 Denmark (Greenland)
 France (Saint Pierre and Miquelon)
 United States of America
 Act Against Slavery (1793)
 Act of Union (1840)
 Atlin Mountain
 Aulneau, Jean-Pierre
 Alberta
 Alberta Basin
 Alberta Civil Enforcement Act
 Alberta Culture Days
 Alberta Enterprise Group
 Amarok Society
Americas
North America
Northern America
Islands of Canada
Arctic Ocean
Baffin Bay
Beaufort Sea
Canadian Arctic Archipelago
Queen Elizabeth Islands
Davis Strait
Hudson Bay
James Bay
Hudson Strait
Kane Basin
Northwestern Passages
North Atlantic Ocean
Bay of Fundy
Gulf of Saint Lawrence (**Golfe du Saint-Laurent)
Great Lakes
Labrador Sea
Newfoundland and Labrador
North Pacific Ocean
Haida Gwaii
Inside Passage
Vancouver Island
Anglo-America
French America
 Arctic and North Temperate Zone
 Arctic Circle
Arctic policy of Canada
 Area Codes
 Art in Canada
 Asian Canadian
 Atlas of Canada
 Auditor General of Canada
 Austin Airways
 Avenir d'enfants

B
 Baffin Bay
 Bank of Canada
 Banking in Canada
 Baptist Convention of Ontario and Quebec
 Baptist Union of Western Canada
 Barbados–Canada relations
 Battle of Batoche
 Battle of Chateauguay
 Battle of Crysler's Farm
 Battle of Lake Erie
 Battle of Lundy's Lane
 Battle of Normandy
 Battle of Queenston Heights
 Battle of Stoney Creek
 Battle of the Plains of Abraham
 Battle of the Thames
 Battle of York
 BC Legislature Raids
 Bay of Fundy
 Beaufort Sea
 Bearskin Airlines
 Beothuks
Bibliography of Canada
Bibliography of Canadian history
Bibliography of Canadian military history
Bibliography of Canadian provinces and territories
 Big Six banks
 Bilingualism in Canada
 Black Canadian
 Blame Canada
 Bloc Québécois
 Booster Juice
 Borderless World Volunteers
 Bowie Seamount
 Boys in Red Tragedy
 Bre-X Gold Scandal
 British Columbia
 British Columbia Archaeological Impact Assessment
 British Columbia Ombudsperson
 British North America
 Business Development Bank of Canada

C
 CTV Television Network
 Cabinet of Canada
 Cable Television Standards Council
 Calm Air
 Canada
 Provinces and territories of Canada
 Alberta
 British Columbia
 Manitoba
 New Brunswick
 Newfoundland and Labrador
 Nova Scotia
 Ontario
 Prince Edward Island
 Quebec
 Saskatchewan
 Northwest Territories
 Nunavut
 Yukon
 Canadians
 Canadiens
 Canada and Iraq War resisters
 Canada and the Iraq War
 Canada and the Vietnam War
 Canada and weapons of mass destruction
 Canada Border Services Agency
 Canada Community Currencies
 Canada Company
 Canada Council
 Canada Cup (hockey)
 Canada Day
 Canada East
 Canada Forum for Nepal
 Canada Health Act
 Canada Health and Social Transfer
 Canada Pension Plan
 Canada Revenue Agency
 Canada West
 Canada–Caribbean relations
 Barbados–Canada relations
 Canada–Cuba relations
 Canada–Grenada relations
 Canada–Haiti relations
 Canada–Jamaica relations
 Canada-France relations
 Canada–France Maritime Boundary Case
 Canada-U.S. Free Trade Agreement
 the Canadas
 Canada's Athletes of the 20th Century
 Canada's Walk of Fame
 Canada's World
 Canadian Auto Workers
 Canadian Alliance
 Canadian Arctic Archipelago
 Canadian Association of Broadcasters
 Canadian Association of Journalists
 Canadian Authors
 Canadian Baptist Ministries
 Canadian Bar Association
 Canadian beer
 Canadian Broadcasting Corporation (CBC)
 Canada China Business Council
 Canadian Centennial
 Canadian Christian Meditation Community
 Canadian Coast Guard
 Canadian Conference of Catholic Bishops
 Canadian Confederation
 Canadian content
 Canadian Convention of Southern Baptists
 Canadian court system
 Canadian Curling Association
 Canadian dollar
 Canadian Embassy in Washington
 Canadian English
 Canadian environment
 Canadian federal election
 Canadian Fire Alarm Association
 Canadian Fisherman
 Canadian Food Inspection Agency
 Canadian football
 Canadian Freelance Union
 Canadian heraldry
 Canadian Hydrographic Service
 Canadian identity
 Canadian Idol
 Canadian incumbents by year
 Canadian Internet Registration Authority
 Canadian Interuniversity Sport
 Canadian Jewellers Association
 Canadian Letters and Images Project
 Canadian Parliamentary Secretary
 Canadian Party of Labour
 Canadian Stars
 Canadian Travel Show
 Canadian literature
 Canadian Martyrs
 Canadian Mining Certification Program
 Canadian Museum for Human Rights
 Canadian Museum of Civilization
 Canadian Museum of Nature
 Canadian Music
 Canadian Music Hall of Fame
 National Parks of Canada
 Canadian National Railway
 Canadian order of precedence
 Canadian Pacific Railway
 Canadian pioneers in early Hollywood
 Canadian postal code
 Canadian Press
 Canadian Professional Figure Skating Championships
 Canadian Radio-television and Telecommunications Commission
 Canadian raising
 Canadian Rockies
 Canadian science fiction
 Canadian Security Intelligence Service
 Canadian Shield
 Canadian Society for the Study of Rhetoric
 Canadian Society of New York
 Canadian Space Agency
 Canadian Special Forces
 Canadian Standards Association
 Canadian Statutory Holiday
 Canadian Tire
 Canadian Undergraduate Technology Conference
 Canadian Union of Skilled Workers
 Canadian University Science Games
 Canadian War Museum
 Canadians of convenience
 Canadiana
 Capital of Canada:  Ottawa
 Capital punishment in Canada
 Caroline Affair
 Carleton University
:Category:Bibliographies of Canada
:Category:Buildings and structures in Canada
:Category:Canada-related lists
:Category:Canada portal
:Category:Canadian culture
:Category:Canadian people
:Category:Canadian portals
:Category:Communications in Canada
:Category:Economy of Canada
:Category:Education in Canada
:Category:Environment of Canada
:Category:Events in Canada
:Category:Geography of Canada
:Category:Government in Canada
:Category:Health in Canada
:Category:History of Canada
:Category:Images of Canada
:Category:Law of Canada
:Category:Military of Canada
:Category:Politics of Canada
:Category:Science and technology in Canada
:Category:Society of Canada
:Category:Sports in Canada
:Category:Transport in Canada
commons:Category:Canada
 Cayley-Galt Tariff
 Census division
 Census division statistics of Canada
 Central Manitoba Railway
 Census of New France
 Charlottetown Accord
 Charlottetown Conference
 Château Clique
 Château Frontenac
 Chiaque Language
 Chief Electoral Officer (Canada)
 Chief Justice of Canada
 Chief of the Defence Staff (Canada)
 Chinese Canadian
 Christopher Dufrost de La Jemeraye
 Cirque du Soleil
 Cinema of Canada
 Citizens' Reference Panel
 Citizenship and Immigration Canada (CIC)
 Civil Code of Quebec
 Clifton Hill, Niagara Falls
 Code for Canada
 Codex canadiensis
 Collège militaire royal de Saint-Jean
 Colonial Militia in Canada
 Commonwealth of Nations
 Commonwealth realm
 Communications in Canada
 Communications Security Establishment
 Conscription Crisis of 1917
 Conscription Crisis of 1944
 Conservative Party of Canada
 Constitution of Canada
 Constitutional Act of 1791
 Constitutional monarchy
 Convention of Atlantic Baptist Churches
 Coureur des bois
 Court system of Canada
 Craigellachie, British Columbia
 Crime in Canada
 Culture of Canada

D
 Davis Strait
 Definitions of Canadian borders
 Della Falls
 Demographics of Canada
 Department of Foreign Affairs and International Trade (Canada)
 Department of Intergovernmental Affairs
 Department of Justice (Canada)
 The Great Depression in Canada
 Deputy Prime Minister of Canada
 Devonshire Initiative
 DEW Line
 Dieppe Raid
 DRE Valcartier
 Drug policy of Canada
 Dufrost de La Jemeraye, Christopher
 Dumont, Gabriel
 Dumont, Yvon

E

 Early Canadian Newspapers
 Economic history of Canada
 Economic impact of immigration to Canada
 Economy of Canada
 Education in Canada
 Edward VIII
 "Eh"
 Elections Canada
 Elizabeth II
 Engineered Lifting Systems & Equipment Inc
 English colonization of the Americas
 English language
 Entartistes
 Ergonomics in Canada
 Euthanasia in Canada
 Extreme points of Canada
 Extreme points of Canadian provinces

F
 Family Compact
 The Famous Five
 Farm Credit Canada
 Federal Identity Program
 Federal-Provincial Distribution of Legislative Powers
 Fellowship of Evangelical Baptist Churches in Canada
 Festivals in Canada
 First Air
 First Ministers conference
 First Nations of Canada
 Flag of Canada
 FLQ
 Foreign relations of Canada
 Fort Garry
 Fort Gibraltar
 Fort Kaministiquia
 Fort La Reine
 Fortress Louisbourg
 Fort St. Charles
 Fort St. Pierre
 Fort Steele, British Columbia
 François de La Vérendrye
 French America
 French Canada
 French colonization of the Americas
 French in Canada
 French language

G
 Geography of Canada
 George V
 George VI
 Global Television Network
 Golfe du Saint-Laurent
 Goods and Services Tax (Canada)
 Governor General of Canada
 Governor General's Award
 Grand Trunk Railway
 Great Lakes
Lake Erie
Lake Huron
Lake Michigan
Lake Michigan–Huron
Lake Ontario
Lake Superior
 Great Peace of Montreal
 Great Seal of Canada
 The Greatest Canadian
 Grits
 Group of Seven
 Groupe TVA
 Gulf of Saint Lawrence

H

 Haida Gwaii
 Halifax Explosion
 Halifax Riot
 Hans Island
 Head-Smashed-In Buffalo Jump
 Health Canada
 Health Care in Canada Survey
 Her Majesty's Canadian Ship
 High-speed rail in Canada
 Highest mountain peaks of Canada
 Her Majesty's loyal opposition (Canada)
 Heritage Moment
 History of Canada
 History of Canadian animation
 History of Canadian film
 History of Canadian sports
 History of Canadian women
 History of cities in Canada
 History of medicine in Canada
 Hockey Canada
 Hockey Night in Canada
 House of Commons of Canada
 Hudson Bay
 Hudson's Bay Company
 Hudson Bay Railway (1910)
 Hudson Bay Railway (1997)
 Hudson Strait
 Human Resources and Skills Development Canada
 Huron Tract

I
Ice hockey
Immigration to Canada
Info Source
Inside Passage
Intendant of New France
Intergovernmental Committee on Urban and Regional Research
International Association of Independent Journalists Inc.
International Organization for Standardization (ISO)
ISO 3166-1 alpha-2 country code for Canada: CA
ISO 3166-1 alpha-3 country code for Canada: CAN
ISO 3166-2:CA region codes for Canada
Islands of Canada
Invasion of Canada (1775)
Irish Canadians
Islam in Canada
Islands of Canada

J
 James Bay
 Japanese Canadian
 Joint Premiers of the Province of Canada
 Joni Mitchell
 Joual

K
 Kaministiquia River
 Kane Basin (waterway)
 Korean War
 Kofc
 Krazy Krazy

L
 Labrador
 Labrador Sea
 Lacrosse
 La Vérendrye, Jean Baptiste de
 la Vérendrye, Pierre Gaultier de Varennes et de
 Lakes of Canada
Great Bear Lake
Great Slave Lake
Lake Erie
Lake Huron
Lake Manitoba
Lake Ontario
Lake Saint Clair
Lake Superior
Lake Winnipeg
Lake Winnipegosis
 Law of Canada
 Le Devoir
 Les Fusiliers Mont-Royal
 Oryssia Lennie
 Liberal Party of Canada
 Liberalism in Canada
 Library and Archives Canada
Lists related to Canada:
Canadian Chess Championship
Canadian royal symbols
Diplomatic missions of Canada
Elections in Canada
Foreign ownership of companies of Canada
Governor General's Warrant
List of Aboriginal communities in Canada
List of Acts of Parliament of Canada
List of airlines of Canada
List of Ambassadors and High Commissioners to Canada
List of areas disputed by Canada and the United States
List of awards named after Governors General of Canada
List of awards presented by the Governor General of Canada
List of bands from British Columbia
List of bands from Canada
List of banks in Canada
List of Biosphere Reserves in Canada
List of botanical gardens in Canada
List of bridges in Canada
List of Canada-related topics by province
List of Canada-related topics
List of Canadian Air Force Equipment
List of Canadian awards
List of Canadian clothing store chains
List of Canadian companies
List of Canadian diplomats
List of Canadian disasters by death toll
List of Canadian divisions in WWII
List of Canadian electric utilities
List of Canadian federal electoral districts
List of Canadian federal general elections
List of Canadian federal parliaments
List of Canadian Formula Fords
List of Canadian Governors General
List of Canadian highways by province
List of Canadian historians
List of Canadian journalists
List of Canadian military divisions
List of Canadian Military Operations
List of Canadian Ministers of the Naval Service
List of Canadian mobile phone companies
List of Canadian monarchs
List of Canadian musicians
List of Canadian newspapers
List of Canadian nuclear facilities
List of Canadian organizations with royal patronage
List of Canadian organizations with royal prefix
List of Canadian playwrights
List of Canadian poets
List of Canadian provincial Acts
List of Canadian provincial and territorial symbols
List of Canadian radio programs
List of Canadian science fiction authors
List of Canadian sports personalities
List of Canadian stores
List of Canadian submissions for the Academy Award for Best Foreign Language Film
List of Canadian telephone companies
List of Canadian television channels
List of Canadian television series
List of Canadian writers
List of Canadians of Polish descent
List of Canadians
List of castles in Canada
List of cathedrals in Canada
List of Chief Justices of the Supreme Court of Canada
List of Chinook Jargon placenames
List of cities in Canada
List of companies of Canada
List of convention and exhibition centres in Canada
List of counties and districts of Canada
List of defunct airlines of Canada
List of dioceses of the Anglican Church of Canada
List of diplomatic missions in Canada
List of disasters in Canada
List of early Canadian newspapers
List of earthquakes in Canada
List of elections in the Province of Canada
List of events in Quebec City
List of Canadians
List of French Canadian writers from outside Quebec
List of highest points of Canadian provinces and territories
List of hospitals in Canada
List of islands of Canada
List of Jewish Canadian politicians
List of lakes in Canada
List of law enforcement agencies in Canada
List of Lieutenant Governors of Nova Scotia
List of Lieutenant Governors of Ontario
List of Lieutenant Governors of Quebec
List of mammals of Canada
List of Manitoba School Divisions and Districts
List of minimum wages in Canada
List of mountains in Canada
List of museums in Canada
List of mutual fund companies in Canada
List of NANP area codes (North American Numbering Plan)
List of National Historic Sites of Canada
List of National Parks of Canada
List of Nazi monuments in Canada
List of Newfoundland and Labrador highways
List of Newfoundland and Labrador rivers
List of Nova Scotia provincial electoral districts
List of Nunavut rivers
List of Canadian official residences
List of Ontario Census Divisions
List of Ontario school boards
List of Ottawa churches
List of paddlesports organizations in Canada
List of people on stamps of Canada
List of political parties in Canada
List of population of Canada by years
List of Premiers of Ontario
List of provincial and territorial nicknames in Canada
List of proposed provinces and territories of Canada
List of Quebec authors
List of regions of Canada
List of rivers of Canada
List of ships of the Canadian Navy
List of sister cities in Canada
List of soccer clubs in Canada
List of stadiums in Canada
List of Supreme Court of Canada cases
List of tariffs in Canada
List of census metropolitan areas and agglomerations in Canada
List of the highest major mountain peaks of Canada
List of the most isolated major mountain peaks of Canada
List of the most prominent mountain peaks of Canada
List of Ultras in Canada
List of ultra prominent peaks of Canada
List of universities in Canada
List of volcanoes in Canada
List of wind farms in Canada
List of years in Canada
List of Yukon territorial highways
List of Yukoners
Lists of mountain peaks of Canada
Lists of radio stations in North America
Orders, decorations, and medals of the Canadian provinces
Topic outline of Canada
 Lizards in Canada
 Loonie
 Louis-Joseph Gaultier de La Vérendrye
 Lou Marsh Trophy
 Lower Canada
 Lower Canada Rebellion
 Lower Fort Garry

M

 Macdonald-Cartier Freeway
 Maclean's Magazine
 Manitoba
 Manitoba 100
 Manitoba Advanced Education and Literacy
 Manitoba archaeological regulations
 Manitoba Blue Cross
 Manitoba Chess Association
 Manitoba Culture, Heritage and Tourism
 Manitoba Provincial Nomination Program
 Manitoba Schools Question
 Manitoba Transit Heritage Association
 Media in Canada
 Media ownership in Canada
 medicare (Canada)
 Meech Lake Accord
 Meteorological Service of Canada
 Metrication in Canada
 Miles for Millions Walkathon
 Military of Canada
 Military history of Canada
 Monarchist League of Canada
 Monarchs of Canada
 Monarchy of Canada
 Montreal
 Most isolated mountain peaks of Canada
 Most prominent mountain peaks of Canada
 Motivate Canada
 Mount Logan
 Mountain peaks of Canada
 Multiculturalism
 Munsinger Affair
 Music of Canada
 Mwinda

N
 NAFTA
 NATO
 National Film Board of Canada
 National Flag of Canada
 National Research Council of Canada
 National question (Quebec)
 Natural scientific research in Canada
 New Brunswick
 New Brunswick Sports Hall of Fame
 New Democratic Party
 New France
 Newfoundland (island)
 Newfoundland and Labrador
 Newfoundland Holiday
 Newfoundland School for the Deaf
 Nickle Resolution
 Ninety-Two Resolutions
 Nortel 
 North America
 North Atlantic Ocean
 North magnetic pole
 North Pacific Ocean
 North Temperate Zone and Arctic
 North West Company
 North-West Rebellion
 Northern America
 Northwest Territories
 Northwest Territories Oil and Gas Operations Act, 2014
 Northwestern Passages
 Nova Scotia
 Nova Scotia Gaelic Mod
 Nova Scotia Secondary School Students' Association
 Nunavut
 Nunavut Kamatsiaqtut Help Line

O
 O Canada – national anthem of Canada
 October Crisis
 Official Opposition (Canada)
 Official Opposition Shadow Cabinet (Canada)
 Ogopogo
 Oka crisis
 Ontario
 Ontario Correctional Services
 Ontario Disability Employment Network
 Ontario Island
 Operation Overlord
 Order of Canada
 Order of Merit
 Order of Merit of the Police Forces
 Order of Military Merit
 Oregon boundary dispute
 Ottawa

P

 Pacific scandal
 Parks Canada
 Patriot War
 Peace café
 Peace, order and good government
 Penguin Book of Canadian Verse
 Philosophy in Canada
 Pierre Gaultier de La Vérendrye
 Politics of Canada
 Port of Churchill
 Portage Avenue
 Portal:Canada
 Poutine
 Poverty in Canada
 Prime Minister of Canada
 Prince Edward Island
 Progressive Conservative Party of Canada
 Progressivism in Canada
 Prohibition in Canada
 Project agreement (Canada)
 Province of Canada
 Provincial tree emblems of Canada
 Public services in Canada
 Pulp and paper industry in Canada

Q
 Quebec
 Quebec Conference, 1864
 Quebec education system
 Quebec television
 Québécois French
 Queen Charlotte Islands
 Queen Elizabeth Islands

R
 Rail transport in Canada
 RCAF Blackouts
 Rebellions of 1837
 Red Ensign
 Red River Rebellion
 Red Tory
 Referendums in Canada
 Regional tartans of Canada
 Regions of Canada
 Religion in Canada
 Rent bank
 Revenue stamps of Canada
 Rhinoceros Party of Canada (1963–1993)
 Rideau Hall
 RightOnCanada.ca
 Roman Catholic Archdiocese of Quebec
 Royal Canadian Legion
 Royal Canadian Mint
 Royal Canadian Mounted Police
 Royal Arms of Canada
 Royal Military College of Canada
 Royal Ontario Museum
 Royal Roads Military College
 Royal standards of Canada
 Royal Victorian Order
 Rupert's Land
 Rush

S

 Saint Catherine Street
 Saulteaux
 Same-sex marriage in Canada
 Saskatchewan
 Science and technology in Canada
 Secessionist movements of Canada
 Second City Television
 Seigneurial system
 Senate of Canada
 Seven Years' War
 Slavery in Canada
 Snowbird
 Snowbirds
 Social insurance number
 Socio-economic mobility in Canada
 Speaker of the House of Commons of Canada
 Sports in Canada
 Spouses of the Prime Ministers of Canada
 Stamps and postal history of Canada
 Staples thesis
 States headed by Elizabeth II
 Statistics Canada
 Status of religious freedom in Canada
 Structure of the Canadian federal government
 Supreme Court of Canada

T

 Tallest structures in Canada
 Takakkaw Falls
 Tax Court of Canada
 Taxation in Canada
 Technological and industrial history of Canada
 Telefilm Canada
 The Maple Leaf Forever
 Theatre in Canada
 This Hour Has Seven Days
 This Hour Has 22 Minutes
 This Magazine
Timelines:
Timeline of prime ministers of Canada
 Tim Hortons
 Topic outline of Canada
 Tourism in Canada
 Trans-Canada Highway
 Transportation in Canada
 Trees of Canada
 Trudeaumania
 twinstick

U

 Ultra prominent peaks of Canada
 Union D'Eglises Baptistes Francaises Au Canada
 Unite the Right
 United Kingdom Canadian community
 United Nations founding member state 1945
UN peacekeeping
 U.S.-Canada relations
 US - Canada softwood lumber dispute
 Upper Canada
 Upper Canada Rebellion
 Upper Fort Garry

V

 Valour Road
 Vancouver Island
 Venerable Order of Saint John
 Vietnam War
 Vimy Ridge
 Volcanism in Canada
 Voyageurs

W
 War of 1812
 Wars of Canada
 War Measures Act
 Water supply and sanitation in Canada
 Wayne Gretzky
 Wendigo
 Westmount, Quebec
 
 Winnipeg
 Canadian wine
 Women in computing in Canada
 Wonderbra
 World War I
 World War II
 Wyandot

X

Y
 Yonge Street
 Yukon Territory

Z
Zipper

Search
Search all pages with prefix

Search all pages with title

See also

Commonwealth of Nations
Outline of Canada
List of international rankings
Lists of country-related topics
United Nations
Index of Aboriginal Canadian-related articles
List of Canada-related topics by provinces and territories

References

External links

Government
 Official website of the Government of Canada
 Official website of the Prime Minister of Canada 
 Official website of the Governor General of Canada
 Official website of the Canadian Forces
 Official Government of Canada online Atlas of Canada
 Permanent Mission of Canada to the United Nations

Crown corporations
 Canadian Broadcasting Corporation
 Canada Post
 Canadian Tourism Commission

 
Canada
Canada